Emma Riff (born 14 December 2000) is a French modern pentathlete.

She participated at the 2018 World Modern Pentathlon Championships, winning a medal.

References

External links

Living people
2000 births
French female modern pentathletes
World Modern Pentathlon Championships medalists
Modern pentathletes at the 2018 Summer Youth Olympics